Lili Monori (born 10 October 1945) is a Hungarian actress. She appeared in more than sixty films since 1968.

Selected filmography

References

External links 

1945 births
Living people
Hungarian film actresses